WNEK-FM (105.1 FM) was a radio station  broadcasting an Educational format. Licensed to Springfield, Massachusetts, US, the station served as a student-run organization. The station was owned by Western New England University. WNEK-FM went streaming on the internet on April 14, 2010. WNEK-FM did not file to renew its license by December 2, 2013; instead, on March 26, 2014, Western New England University informed the Federal Communications Commission that the station's license would be allowed to expire on April 1. The station originally held the call sign WTRZ, named after Dean of Students Theodore R. Zern; it became WNEK-FM in 1979. Before its last presence on 105.1, WNEK (WTRZ) was located at 89.1, 97.5, and 99.7. Currently, you can access the station via online radio sites.

References

External links

NEK-FM
Western New England University
Mass media in Springfield, Massachusetts
Radio stations established in 1976
1976 establishments in Massachusetts
Radio stations disestablished in 2014
2014 disestablishments in Massachusetts
Defunct radio stations in the United States
NEK-FM
NEK-FM